Geophis blanchardi, also known as Blanchard's earth snake, is a snake of the colubrid family. It is endemic to Mexico.

References

Geophis
Snakes of North America
Endemic reptiles of Mexico
Taxa named by Edward Harrison Taylor
Taxa named by Hobart Muir Smith
Reptiles described in 1939